HMAS Goorangai was a 223-ton auxiliary minesweeper of the Royal Australian Navy (RAN). She was built in 1919 for the Government of New South Wales, then sold in 1926 to the fishing company Cam & Sons. The trawler was requisitioned for military service following the outbreak of World War II, converted into a minesweeper, and assigned to Melbourne.

Construction
Goorangai was built by the Government Dockyard, Newcastle in 1919, for use by the Government of New South Wales.

Operational history
The vessel was in government service until 1926, when she was sold to Sydney-based fishing company Cam & Sons for use as a trawler.

At the start of World War II, Goorangai was requisitioned for military service on 8 September 1939; one of eight vessels requisitioned from Cam & Sons during the war. The vessel underwent modification, and was fitted with minesweeping gear, a QF 12-pounder 12 cwt naval gun, and depth charges. After conversion into an auxiliary minesweeper, Goorangai was commissioned into the RAN on 9 September 1939, and assigned the pennant number GR. She was operated by Royal Australian Navy Reserve personnel: 21 sailors and 3 officers. Goorangai was assigned to Minesweeping Group 54, which was based in Melbourne and tasked with keeping Bass Strait and surrounding waters clear of mines.

Collision and loss
On the night of 20 November, Goorangai was crossing the mouth of Port Phillip Bay to anchor at Portsea for the night. The minesweeper was sailing under 'brownout' conditions, with minimal lighting. At 20:37, en route to Sydney, emerged from Port Phillip Bay and cut Goorangai in two. The small auxiliary sank within a minute, taking all 24 personnel aboard with her. Only six bodies were recovered, one of which couldn't be identified. Goorangai and her ship's company were the RAN's first loss in World War II, and the first RAN surface ship ever to be sunk while in service.

News of the accident quickly spread in Melbourne, as the media outlets decided that as the loss of life was due to an accident and not military action, censorship restrictions did not reply. The Australian Commonwealth Naval Board disagreed, and the War Cabinet later issued supplementary instructions preventing the publishing of any loss of Australian personnel or equipment without approval. The Court of Marine Inquiry initially found both ships to be at fault for the collision, but later exonerated the captain of Duntroon as poor positioning of lights aboard the minesweeper, which led him to believe that the minesweeper was on a parallel course, was identified as the main cause of the accident.

Memorials
A memorial cairn was erected at Queenscliff in 1981. The ship was recognised under the Historic Ship Wrecks Act on 16 November 1995. In 2004, the Royal Australian Naval Professional Studies Program initiated a series of occasional papers focusing on subjects related to the Naval Reserve: the series was named Goorangai, after the ship.

A memorial plaque is also dedicated to HMAS Goorangai and her Tasmanian RAN personnel at the Tasmanian Seafarers' Memorial at Triabunna on the east coast of Tasmania.

Dive site
In January 1941 the wreckage was reduced by blasting to sections of structural plating up to 2 m high, and a small cylindrical boiler, with bits of scattered broken machinery. The wreckage is heavily overgrown  by encrusting invertebrates, with prolific fish and mobile invertebrate life, and covers some 200 m2 of sandy seabed in the South Channel, where anchoring is prohibited. Strong tidal currents make timing important.

Latitude: 38° 17.404′ S, Longitude: 144° 40.992′ E, Datum: WGS84, depth 13 to 15 m.

References

Fishing ships of Australia
Maritime incidents in November 1940
Minesweepers of the Royal Australian Navy
Shipwrecks of Victoria (Australia)
1919 ships
Underwater diving sites in Australia
Ships sunk in collisions